Motocross is an off-road racing sport that is raced on a dirt bike around a track, there are multiple riders going around at a time and the first person to complete the required number of laps in the shortest period of time wins. The women's motocross league is separate from men's motocross because of the different rules, and also the different bike sizes. Women generally race bikes that are 125cc or 250cc because they are not big enough to ride a 450cc. These differences make it hard for men and women to compete together however it is done and is allowed. Women compete in the AMA races but rarely make it into the main event because their practice laps and heat laps are not fast enough. Women's professional motocross has the support of professional male riders also. Male riders think that growing the sport in any way possible is a positive and that the more people riding the better the sport will be. As well as having the support from male riders, females are starting to step up and support their colleagues as well, by helping each other train and practice, there is support from both males and females that is helping the sport to go exponentially.

Background and history 
Motocross started in approximately 1924 over in Europe and spread very quickly to the United States due to immigration and the moving of families for job and freedom opportunities. Women's professional motocross is an organized sports league where females can compete for money and prizes at the highest level of motocross. Women's motocross began in Europe in the early 1950s and 1960s and moved to the United States in the middle of the 1960s. This was during the time that women's equality movements were strong, helping the sport to grow. In 1971 Kerry Kleid was the first woman to receive a professional motocross rider license, which was revoked after it was discovered that she was a woman. When processing her license paperwork, the registry did not know that she was a female because there was no box that indicated this information. When she showed up at the first race in Unadilla, she was told that she could not race because she was a woman. Kerry then went to court and eventually won her license back. However, this was the first time in history when women understood that they could be professionals in the world of motocross. In 1974 the first Powder Puff National Championship took place which marked the first time that a specifically women's National Championship was available for female motocross riders in the United States. The "Powder Puff" was a motocross event where women could race in heats in order to qualify for the main event, or the last race of the night with the chance to win the championship. In 1975 the event's name was changed from the Powder Puff National Championship to the Women's Motocross Nationals. The championship took place ever year consecutively from 1975 through today, although in 1982 and 1986 the races were not held. In 1996 the Women's Motocross League (WML) was founded after the first Women's Supercross Championships took place in 1995. Because of this the WML was allowed to petition to be a part of the AMA Pro Motocross Championship, which included the men's ranks and races. This led to the creation of the Women's Motocross Association, which was founded in 2004 and sold to MX Sports, a large motocross corporation, in 2009. The selling of this allows for women's motocross to remain a permanent part of men's motocross and the motocross industry. This also caused a change in the naming of WMA to WMX, so that it would fit in with the rest of the corporation. In order to keep women racing factory teams started to offer female riders contracts so that they could get the women to race their motorcycles. Factory teams are large corporations and the main companies that produce and distribute motorcycles. There are over 250 factory teams in the United States alone including the major ones Suzuki, Yamaha, Honda, KTM, and Kawasaki. Without these sponsorships and contracts it is nearly impossible for a person to support a professional race team on their own, the cost is too much. In order to receive a factory ride, the women had to prove that they were on top of the game and that they were willing to work hard and put the hours necessarily in to get better. The training that they endure goes beyond just riding their dirt bike, it happens in the gym and on pedal bikes as well. These riders worked for the best bikes that money could buy, because if they did not they would be out of a job and also unable to support their racing. It costs over $200,000.00 a year for an elite motocross rider to be ready for the season. This includes having the best bike, the best trainers, spare parts, a way to get the bikes to the track, fuel costs and many more expenses.

Culture 
Women's motocross is full of people who have a no quit mentality and are often heard saying things like " I won't quit until I am physically unable to ride". These mentalities are what keeps the sport alive and well, without them it would have died long ago. Women's motocross is a sport that requires dedication and constant work, so the people who are involved in it, both the riders and the teams, have to be mentally strong. In order to make this sport a success women had to put in hard work and be mentally strong, they heard the word no more times than most but kept going. Having a strong mentality is what allows women's sports at the professional level to be a success. Much like the male counterpart, professional women's racing requires hours of training in order to be on top. This league is full of only the best riders and the most successful women, so without the mental aspect, these women would not be able to compete in the league. The biological level of mental toughness plays a large role in the success of this sport, women who have had parents who did not allow them to quit and who pushed them harder than they thought they could be pushed often came out on top because they were trained not to quit. There are physiological reasons that some athletes possess the ability to be best, the way that their mind functions and the hormonal excretions in their body allow them to push themselves hard and longer than the regular person. It was in their mind and heart to be the best, much like every other athlete, how a competitor does their job says a lot about who they are as a person, and how far they are willing to go in order to win.

Most influential female rider 
There rider who stands out of the pack when talking about women's motocross is Ashley Fiolek, she has the ability to go above and beyond the normal realm of what is expected of the female rider. ,  She is the fastest female on the track and knows it, with a confidence that most women dream of having she takes each lap for what it is and has a level head that allows her to keep pushing and progressing.

Ashley Fiolek 
Ashley Fiolek, a native of Dearborn Michigan, born on October 22, 1990 is the most accomplished rider of this generation.  She has won more amateur and professional races than anyone else in her age group and has stayed on top for the longest period of time.  She was born deaf which is one of the most important reasons for why she starting racing. Because Ashley was unable to hear and participate easily in team sports, she picked up riding due to the fact that she could do it by herself and not have to talk or hear anything other than the bike. Being deaf served as one of her greatest advantages while racing because she could not hear what was going on outside the track, she only had to focus on what she was doing which allowed her to dial in and focus at a level that most other riders are unable to do. She is able to get on the track and block everything else out other than the things that she is focusing on, such as jumping, cornering and passing competitors. Ashley started racing dirt bikes when she was just 7 years old and has been racing ever since. Fiolek is a factory rider for Team Honda, with whom she has been signed ever since she was young. They give her the support that she needs in order to run the cleanest and most successful bike on the track. Through their sponsorship, Ashely is able to ride one of the best bikes available. At the young age of 21 Fiolek walked away from racing in the pros due to the impossible contracts and because the sport that she loved was taking a turn that she did not want to continue on with. Ashley now trains younger riders to be the best racers that they can. Though there are other influential riders in women's motocross, none hold the same list of accomplishments that Ashley does.

References

Women's sports
Motocross
Motorcycle off-road racing series